Edwin "Chapo" Rosario Rivera (March 15, 1963 – December 1, 1997) was a Puerto Rican professional boxer who competed from 1979 to 1997. He is a world champion in two weight classes, having held the WBC lightweight title from 1983 to 1984, the WBA lightweight title twice between 1986 and 1990, and the WBA super lightweight title from 1991 to 1992. Known for his exceptional boxing skills, dynamite right hand and rock solid chin Rosario's final record stands at 47-6

Rosario was posthumously inducted into the International Boxing Hall of Fame in 2006.

Early life and career
Edwin Rosario was born in Candelaria barrio, Toa Baja, an extremely poor barrio on the north coast of Puerto Rico. Rosario's older brother Papo became a professional boxer, beginning what  looked like a promising career. Edwin and Papo were the sons of Antonio Rosario and Elizabeth Rivera. They also had three sisters.

His boxing manager and coach (trainer), Manny Siaca Sr., had noticed the younger Edwin Rosario's talent when the boy was 8 years old. Inspired by his brother Papo, Chapo Rosario, as he became known in the world of boxing, had a stellar amateur boxing career.

Professional boxing career
Chapo's brother Papo died unexpectedly, purportedly due to drugs, two years after his entry into professional boxing. Rosario persevered, wanting to honor his brother's memory by winning a world championship. He scored big knockout wins over Young Ezzard Charles and Edwin Viruet. He beat Charles in three rounds on the Benitez-Duran undercard in January 1982 in Las Vegas.  He also defeated Viruet in three rounds; that opponent had boxed 25 rounds against Roberto Durán-including a world lightweight championship bout-without being knocked out.

Rosario eventually gained a record of 21–0 with 20 knockouts.  This led to talks of a title fight against World Boxing Council (WBC) lightweight champion Alexis Argüello, to be held in Miami. But Argüello relinquished the title in order to move up in weight to challenge junior welterweight champion Aaron Pryor.

Boxing champion

With Arguello moving divisions, Rosario was matched with Mexico's José Luis Ramírez on May 1, 1983 for the vacant WBC lightweight title.  Rosario seemed to have the momentum over the first half of the fight, but tired down the stretch to make for a very close outcome. The judges, as well as most of the public present, felt Rosario had done enough to win. He became world lightweight champion by the unanimous score of 115–113 on all 3 judging cards. Rosario injured his hand during the fight and needed surgery, for which the World Boxing Council gave him a dispensation.

He didn't return to the ring until 1984. In his first defense of the title, he faced Roberto Elizondo, who had lasted 7 rounds with Argüello in a previous world title challenge and was expected to give him a tough fight. Rosario knocked out Elizondo in one round. Howard Davis Jr proved more of a challenge – Davis Jr was ahead on all scorecards with ten seconds remaining in the bout, but was dropped by Rosario for the second time in their fight at that point, and lost a split decision.

A rematch with Ramírez was scheduled, again in San Juan, Puerto Rico, on November 3, 1984. Rosario dropped Ramírez once in round one and again in the second, but the challenger got off the canvas to take Rosario's title away with a fourth-round TKO. This was Rosario's first defeat. Some fans felt he never fully recovered, although he won three more championships.

Rosario won a comeback fight against Frankie Randall, the future world champion, in London. He had to wait another year before an opportunity to regain the title. On June 13, 1986, he met the world champion Hector 'Macho' Camacho at Madison Square Garden in New York. The fight was televised by HBO, and although Rosario shook Camacho badly in the fifth round and rallied down the stretch, Camacho swept the middle rounds. The judges, in a split decision, awarded Camacho the fight.

Because of the closeness of that bout, the WBA gave Rosario a chance to challenge Livingstone Bramble, one of two other world lightweight champions (the other one being the International Boxing Federation's Jimmy Paul). Rosario went to Miami and defeated Bramble by knockout in the second round to become world lightweight champion for the second time. His pose, raising his arms after the fight, became The Ring magazine's cover for the next month — the only time Rosario was featured on its English-version cover.

Rosario defended the WBA lightweight title against fellow Puerto Rican Juan Nazario with a knockout in eight in Chicago. 

In Rosario's next defense, he faced WBC super featherweight title holder Julio César Chávez, on November 21, 1987, in Las Vegas. Chavez moved up in weight to challenge for Rosario's title, and he battered the lightweight champion. By the tenth round, Rosario's left eye was completely shut. His right eye was swollen, and he was bleeding from the nose and mouth.  Referee Richard Steele stopped the fight at 2:38 of the eleventh round at the request of Rosario's corner.  At the time of the stoppage, Rosario trailed on the judges' scorecards by the following scores: Jerry Roth: 98-92. Bob Watson: 99-91. Albert Tramari 100-92 (2 rounds even).

Rosario was inactive for seven months then went 7–0 with 6 KO's in his next fights. After Chavez vacated the title in 1989, Rosario came back and won it again, beating Anthony Jones, a tough Kronk prospect for the championship.

Rosario joined a small group of men who had become world champions three times in the same division. This time, however, he didn't hold the title for long. When he gave Nazario a 1990 rematch at Madison Square Garden, he was defeated on cuts in the 8th round.

Rosario moved up a weight class to the junior welterweight division, and defeated defending world champion Loreto Garza in three rounds in Sacramento's Arco Arena to become a world champion for the 4th time.

However, personal problems started to take their toll. In his first defense, against Japanese Akinobu Hiranaka in Mexico City on April 10, 1992, he lost by a 1st-round TKO. He later lost a rematch to Frankie Randall, by technical knockout in seven rounds.

Later career and death
Rosario disappeared from the boxing scene. Years later he received media attention after being arrested for stealing beer from a supermarket. He vowed to stay clean and went into a program to achieve this.

In 1997, he won two comeback fights, then won the Caribbean welterweight title by beating Roger Benito Flores of Nicaragua in Bayamón, Puerto Rico, in a twelve-round decision. Once an HBO staple, Rosario was then fighting on small cards without any TV showings. He was ranked #10 among Oscar De La Hoya's challengers at the welterweight division after his win over Flores, making him an official world title challenger once again.

He defeated Sanford Ricks at Madison Square Garden. In his final fight on September 25, 1997, Rosario knocked out Harold Bennett in two rounds at Bayamon. He died before fighting again.

On December 1, 1997, Rosario visited the home of his ex-wife and four daughters, but he cut his visit short an hour later, saying he felt ill. After returning home where he lived with his parents, Rosario was later found dead in his bed by his father. He was found to have died of an aneurysm on December 1, 1997, with fluid accumulated in the lungs. Doctors said that his history of narcotics and alcohol abuse was a factor.

Many celebrities and dignitaries attended his funeral, and a group of Puerto Rican world boxing champions were among the pallbearers. More than 5,000 people came to the funeral or watched from their homes as the coffin was driven from the funeral home to the cemetery.

Professional boxing record

Legacy and honors
He won three world championships in the same division.
On January 12, 2006, Rosario was inducted into the International Boxing Hall of Fame, the sixth Puerto Rican inducted into the hall.
According to Ring Magazine, Edwin Rosario ranks #36 on the list of "100 Greatest Punchers of All Time."

See also

List of world lightweight boxing champions
List of world light-welterweight boxing champions
List of Puerto Rican boxing world champions
Sports in Puerto Rico

References

External links

 

|-

|-

1963 births
1997 deaths
Puerto Rican male boxers
People from Toa Baja, Puerto Rico
20th-century Puerto Rican people
Deaths from aneurysm
World Boxing Council champions
World Boxing Association champions
World lightweight boxing champions
World light-welterweight boxing champions
International Boxing Hall of Fame inductees